The Thomasville Public Library is located in Thomasville, North Carolina, United States.  It is the second largest branch of the Davidson County Public Library system.  Since its inception in October, 1928, the library has grown from one room in the corner of a Thomasville school housing a collection of 200 books to a  independent structure housing more than 70,000 books as well as magazines and journals, non-print materials, public access computers, and meeting rooms that are generally free for public use.

History 

In March 1928, the Davidson County government established a fund of $7,000 for the Lexington and Thomasville branches of the newly established Davidson County Public Library system.  The first Thomasville Public Library opened on October 25, 1928. It was located in a room on the west side of the second floor of the Main Street School building.  It housed 200 books.

Over a few years, the library outgrew the space given to it at the Main Street School. It moved to two different storefronts in the commercial district of Thomasville between 1928 and 1938.  At times throughout that decade the library had to limit checkouts to one book per person because the number of readers nearly equaled the number of books on hand.

The people of Thomasville, understanding the usefulness of a public library, established a new and larger place for it. For twenty years Thomasville's City Hall housed the library in a wing specifically designed for it.  From 1938 until 1958, the library served its community from there, also making use of the court room and meetings rooms when they were not being used by the city.  As the library's collection and readership grew through the next twenty years from about 6,500 books to over 15,000, and as the city of Thomasville grew and required more space for its administration, the need for a dedicated library building became apparent.

On April 20, 1958, Thomasville received that dedicated building.  It formally opened at the new . building on Randolph Street. A majority of the funding for the building came from the Lambeth and Finch families of Thomasville.  The first library structure owned by the county in its time, it had shelf space for 20,000 books and a maximum capacity of 60 people.

As early as 1979, expansion was perceived to be necessary and, during the 1980s the library board of trustees began researching the costs associated with building a new structure.  In 1987 they approached the county officials to request that they dedicate funds to the construction of a new library building. While the county did dedicate $300,000, money to complete the project was raised mainly by the community and local charities.  Construction began in 1989, and in 1990 the library moved to its current location at 14 Randolph Street.

Services 

Computer Classes
Research assistance
Public meeting rooms
Public access computers
Summer reading programs
Ancestry.com library edition free

Virtual Library 

Many of the electronic resources to which the Thomasville Public Library subscribes may be accessed from home using a library card PIN.  Online services including reserving books, checking fines and due dates, changing contact information, and renewing checked out items.

Other resources available remotely:
NCLive – Search hundreds of journals
CultureGrams
Heritage Quest
Literary Reference Center
North Carolina Digital Library – Books, audio, and movies available for free download
NCKnows – Free 24-hour live reference assistance

External links 
Davidson County Public Library Home Page
NCLive
North Carolina Digital Library
NCKnows

Education in Davidson County, North Carolina
Public libraries in North Carolina
Buildings and structures in Davidson County, North Carolina
Library buildings completed in 1958
Library buildings completed in 1990
Thomasville, North Carolina